Dahmer is a German surname.  People with the surname include:

 Hugo Dahmer (1918–2006), German Luftwaffe ace 
 Jeffrey Dahmer (1960–1994), American serial killer 
 John Dahmer (1937–1988), Canadian politician
 Vernon Dahmer (1908–1966), American civil rights activist murdered by the KKK in 1966
  (born 1937), German sociologist
  (born 1974), Brazilian cartoonist

See also
 Dahmer (disambiguation)

German-language surnames